Sun Huadong (born 7 January 1991) is a Chinese equestrian. He competed in the individual eventing at the 2020 Summer Olympics.

References

External links
 

1991 births
Living people
Chinese male equestrians
Olympic equestrians of China
Equestrians at the 2020 Summer Olympics
Place of birth missing (living people)
Event riders